Brian Joseph Jozwiak (born June 20, 1963) is a former  American football offensive lineman who played college football at West Virginia University before playing professionally for the Kansas City Chiefs in the National Football League.

Early years
Jozwiak was born in Catonsville, Maryland.  He began his football career as a defensive tackle in the Baltimore area.  Jozwiak earned honorable-mention all-metro player honors while playing for Catonsville High School.

College career
When enrolling at West Virginia, Mountaineers' coach Don Nehlen moved Jozwiak from defensive tackle to offensive lineman. Jozwiak not only led the way for West Virginia ballcarriers, but blocked for Mountaineer quarterback Jeff Hostetler. In 1985, Jozwiak was named a consensus All-American, the sixth Mountaineer ever such honored at that time. He was also named a second-team All-American by the Associated Press in 1983.

Professional career
Jozwiak was selected in the first round, 7th overall of the 1986 NFL Draft by the Kansas City Chiefs. He played three pro seasons before suffering a career-ending hip injury.

Post football
As of 2015, Jowziak is residing in North Port, Florida and is a HOPE & PE teacher at North Port High School.

References

1963 births
Living people
All-American college football players
American football offensive linemen
Kansas City Chiefs players
People from Catonsville, Maryland
Players of American football from Maryland
West Virginia Mountaineers football players